Rhodognaphalon brevicuspe is a species of flowering plant in the family Malvaceae. It is found in Cameroon, Republic of the Congo, Democratic Republic of the Congo, Ivory Coast, Gabon, Ghana, Nigeria, and Sierra Leone. It is threatened by habitat loss.

References

Bombacoideae
Flora of West Tropical Africa
Vulnerable plants
Taxonomy articles created by Polbot
Taxobox binomials not recognized by IUCN